João Cunha e Silva and Nuno Marques were the defending champions, but lost in the first round this year.

Andrea Gaudenzi and Diego Nargiso won in the final 6–4, 7–6, against Cristian Brandi and Filippo Messori.

Seeds

  Tom Kempers /  Menno Oosting (semifinals)
  Tomás Carbonell /  Jens Knippschild (semifinals)
  Wayne Arthurs /  Libor Pimek (quarterfinals)
  Cristian Brandi /  Filippo Messori (final)

Draw

Draw

External links
Draw

1998 ATP Tour
1998 Grand Prix Hassan II